Kyriaki Konstantinidou (born 30 November 1984) is a Greek cyclist. She competed in the women's points race at the 2004 Summer Olympics.

References

1984 births
Living people
Greek female cyclists
Olympic cyclists of Greece
Cyclists at the 2004 Summer Olympics
Sportspeople from Thessaloniki
21st-century Greek women